Silver Jubilee Government College is located in B- Camp, Kurnool, Andhra Pradesh, India. It was established on the occasion of Silver Jubilee Celebrations of independence India.

It was established in 1972 by the government of Andhra Pradesh. Both male and female students from Andhra Pradesh are admitted after passing an entrance test.
In 2018 NIRF Rankings given by the Ministry of Human Resource development, Silver jubilee Govt college (A) secured 35th rank in colleges all over the India and it is the NO.1 college in the state of Andhra Pradesh.

It was the brain child of  Sri. P.V. Narasimha Rao, then Chief Minister of Andhra Pradesh and Sri M. V. Rajagopal, I.A.S., the then Director and Secretary of Education, government of Andhra Pradesh. With the background of separatist movements, they had a dream of establishing a statewide educational institution to promote regional reconciliation, by admitting students from all the three regions of the state, the coastal Andhra, Telangana and Rayalaseema. They wanted to provide an atmosphere free from financial worries by providing free boarding, free lodging and free coaching. Their dream materialized and took shape in the form of Silver Jubilee Government College, a residential degree college, located in Kurnool, the first capital of Andhra Pradesh. The students were admitted from all the three regions of the state, coastal Andhra, Telangana and Rayalaseema in the ratio of 42:36:22, on merit basis through a statewide entrance test .

The University Grants Commission, New Delhi, conferred  Autonomy in 2005. The National Accreditation and Assessment Council, Bangalore, has examined the academic and infra-structural facilities and awarded an "A" grade. The college has introduced vocational courses like Industrial Chemistry, Pharmaceutical Chemistry, Microbiology, Biochemistry, Computer science, and Travel and Tourism. Postgraduate courses in English, Telugu and Physics, Chemistry, Mathematics and Economics have been started. Jawahar Knowledge Centre train the students in communication skills, spoken English and software basics.

College is also having  Co - curricular activities & organisations  like NSS, NCC, Sports, Zym facilities for all the students.

Principals
List of Principals:
  Sri A. Nagabhushana Rao, 	(18-10-1972 to 19-04-1973)
  Sri M. S. Sastry,  	(20-04-1973 to 15-07-1976)
  Sri M. K. Ramakrishnan, 	(16-07-1976 to 18-09-1981)
  Sri R. Sri Rama Raju,  	(19-09-1981 to 13-12-1981)
  Sri R. K. Babu,  	(14-12-1981 to 28-02-1983)
  Sri K. Srikanthan,  	(01-03-1983 to 08-06-1983)
  Dr. S. Lakshman Rao, 	(09-06-1983 to 08-03-1984)
  Sri K. SriKanthan,   	(09-03-1984 to 16-04-1984)
  Sri P. Raja Rao,  	(17-04-1984 to 01-04-1986)
  Sri A. V. Koti Reddy,  	(02-04-1986 to 30-09-1993)
  Sri S. K. Peeran,   	(01-10-1993 to 23-12-1993)
  Dr. G. V. Ramanaiah,  	(24-12-1993 to 31-10-1996)
  Sri P. Narayana Rao,   	(01-11-1996 to 21-12-1996)
  Sri D. Satyanarayana Reddy, 	(22-12-1996 to 16-01-1999)
  Sri T. Dastagiri Reddy,  	(17-01-1999 to 16-11-2000)
  Dr. A. Venkata Subbaiah, (17-11-2000 to 30-06-2001)
  Sri C. Mohan Rao,  	(01-07-2001 to 30-11-2002)
  Sri Md. Ghouse,   	(01-12-2002 to 08-09-2004)
  Sri S. Venkata Subbaiah, 	(09-09-2004 to 31-03-2005)
  Dr. M. Nagaraju,  (01-04-2005 To 21-04-2007)
  Sri T. C. V. Subba Rao, 	(22-04-2007 to 31-05-2008)
  Dr. T. G. R. Prasad  	(03-06-2008 to 15-05-2013)
  Dr. S. Abdul Khader          (16-05-2013 to 31-07-2018)

Academics
The college offers Arts, Commerce and Science Courses in graduation.

Bachelor Of Science (B.Sc)
 Mathematics, Physics, Chemistry 
 Mathematics, Physics, Computer Science 
 Mathematics, Physics, web technologies
 Zoology, Biotechnology, Chemistry & Botany, zoology Chemistry
 Botany, Microbiology, Chemistry
 Botany, Biotechnology, Chemistry
 Botany, Horticulture, chemistry

Bachelor of Commerce (B.com)
 computers
 General

Bachelor of Arts (B.A)
 History, Economics, Political Science English & Telugu medium
Postgraduate courses
 M.A Telugu, English, Economics
 M.Sc Maths, Physics, Chemistry
 M.Com

External links
 http://www.linkedin.com/groups?about=&gid=133016&trk=anet_ug_grppro here

References 

Colleges in Andhra Pradesh
Universities and colleges in Kurnool district
Kurnool
Educational institutions established in 1972
1972 establishments in Andhra Pradesh